Conus evansi is a species of sea snail, a marine gastropod mollusk in the family Conidae, the cone snails, cone shells or cones.

These snails are predatory and venomous. They are capable of "stinging" humans.

Description
The size of the shell attains 41 mm.

Distribution
This marine species of cone snail occurs in the Red Sea.

References

 Bondarev, I., 2001. Description of a new cone species (Conus evansi) from the Red Sea, Dahlak (Gastropoda, Conidae). La Conchiglia 299: 25–26, 61
 Tucker J.K. & Tenorio M.J. (2013) Illustrated catalog of the living cone shells. 517 pp. Wellington, Florida: MdM Publishing
 Puillandre N., Duda T.F., Meyer C., Olivera B.M. & Bouchet P. (2015). One, four or 100 genera? A new classification of the cone snails. Journal of Molluscan Studies. 81: 1-23

External links
 To World Register of Marine Species
 Cone Shells - Knights of the Sea
 

evansi
Gastropods described in 2001